Shaanxi Aircraft Corporation is a Chinese aircraft manufacturer and supplier to the Chinese military based in Hanzhong, Shaanxi province. It is a subsidiary of the Aviation Industry Corporation of China (AVIC).

Products

Transports

 Shaanxi Y-8 medium size medium range transport, near copy of the Antonov An-12
 Y-8 ESM ESM aircraft
 Y-8 C3I airborne command post aircraft
 Y-8 battlefield surveillance
 Y-8 radar test bed
 Y-8 maritime patrol aircraft
 Y-8 avionics test bed
 Y-8-F600 transport
 Y-9 multi-purpose transport, developed as a stretched version of the Shaanxi Y-8F with greater payload and range.  The Y-9 is considered China's attempt to build a C-130J class transport aircraft.
 Y-5 transport, copy of the Antonov An-2
 Y-7 transport, copy of the Antonov An-24

See also
 Aviation Industry Corporation of China
 Changhe Aircraft Industries Corporation
 Chengdu Aircraft Industry Group
 ACAC consortium
 Guizhou Aircraft Industry Co.
 Harbin Aircraft Industry Group
 Hongdu Aviation Industry Corporation
 Shanghai Aviation Industrial Company
 Shenyang Aircraft Corporation
 Xi'an Aircraft Industrial Corporation

References

External links

 Shaanxi Aircraft Corporation Official Website 

Aircraft manufacturers of China
Defence companies of the People's Republic of China
Companies based in Shaanxi